The 50th Flying Training Squadron is part of the 14th Flying Training Wing based at Columbus Air Force Base, Mississippi.  It operates Northrop T-38C Talon aircraft conducting flight training.

Mission
Training Combat Pilots for America

The advanced phase of undergraduate pilot training is conducted by the 50th Flying Training Squadron. This phase consists of 101.69 hours of academic instruction, 69 hours of ground training, 36.9 hours of simulator instruction, and 69 sorties comprising 96.9 hours of flight instruction in the Northrop T-38C. Training includes advanced aircraft handling, tactical navigation, fluid maneuvering and an increased emphasis in two- and four-ship formation. At the completion of training, the graduate is awarded the aeronautical rating of pilot.

History

World War II

The 50th flew patrols on the West Coast of the United States from February–June 1942 then provided air defense of Iceland from August 1942-February 1944.  It was not operational between February 1944 and its inactivation in August 1944.

Air Force reserves
The squadron was active in the reserve from 1947 to 1949.

Flying training
The squadron has conducted undergraduate pilot training since, 1 June 1972.

Lineage
 Constituted as the 50th Pursuit Squadron (Fighter) on 20 November 1940
 Activated on 15 January 1941
 Redesignated 50th Fighter Squadron (Twin Engine) on 15 May 1942
 Redesignated 50th Fighter Squadron, Two Engine on 28 February 1944
 Disbanded on 9 August 1944
 Reconstituted and redesignated 50th Fighter Squadron (All Weather) on 23 May 1947
 Activated in the reserve on 12 June 1947
 Inactivated on 27 June 1949
 Redesignated 50th Flying Training Squadron on 22 Mar 1972
 Activated on 1 June 1972

Assignments
 14th Pursuit Group (later 14th Fighter Group), 15 January 1941
 342d Composite Group, 14 November 1942
 Eighth Air Force, February–9 Aug 1944 (attached to 8th Reconnaissance Group (Provisional) [later, 802d Reconnaissance Group {Provisional)])
 Second Air Force, 12 June 1947
 381st Bombardment Group, 30 September 1947 – 27 June 1949
 14th Flying Training Wing, 1 Jun 1972
 14th Operations Group, 15 December 1991 – present

Stations

 Hamilton Field, California, 15 January 1941
 March Field, California, 10 June 1941
 Metropolitan Oakland Municipal Airport, California, 8 February 1942
 Hamilton Field, California, 9 May–16 July 1942
 RAF Atcham (Station 342), England, 18 August 1942 (operated from Meeks Field, Iceland)
 Meeks Field, Iceland, 14 November 1942

 RAF Nuthampstead (Station 131), England, Feb 1944
 RAF Cheddington (Station 113), England, c. 15 Mar 1944
 RAF Watton (Station 376), England, 12 April–9 August 1944
 Offutt Field (later Offutt Air Force Base), Nebraska, 12 June 1947 – 27 June 1949
 Columbus Air Force Base, Mississippi, 1 Jun 1972 – present)

Aircraft

 Curtiss P-40 Warhawk (1941–1942)
 Lockheed P-38 Lightning (1942–1944)
 North American AT-6 Texan (1947–1949)
 Northrop T-38A Talon (1972–2003)
 Northrop T-38C Talon (2002–Present)

See also

 50 FTS Performing Atlanta Braves Opening Day Flyover

References

Notes

Bibliography

•	Malayney, Norman, The 25th Bomb Group (Rcn) in World War II, 2011, Schiffer Publishing Ltd., ISBN 978-0-7643-3950-9, Section: 50th Fighter Squadron pp-22-30.

External links
50th Flying Training Squadron Website
Columbus AFB Public Site:
 https://web.archive.org/web/20071123064834/http://www.columbus.af.mil/library/factsheets/factsheet.asp?id=5233

Military units and formations in Mississippi
0050